Hiromichi Ito (born 1 November 1963) is a Japanese wrestler. He competed in the men's Greco-Roman 74 kg at the 1988 Summer Olympics.

References

External links
 

1963 births
Living people
Japanese male sport wrestlers
Olympic wrestlers of Japan
Wrestlers at the 1988 Summer Olympics
Place of birth missing (living people)
Asian Games medalists in wrestling
Wrestlers at the 1986 Asian Games
Wrestlers at the 1990 Asian Games
Asian Games silver medalists for Japan
Asian Games bronze medalists for Japan
Medalists at the 1986 Asian Games
Medalists at the 1990 Asian Games
20th-century Japanese people
21st-century Japanese people